Ding Ning (born Lee Pei-Ling; 4 July 1970) is a Taiwanese actress. She won critical acclaim and a Golden Horse Award for her supporting role in the film Cities of Last Things (2018). She was also nominated for a Taipei Film Award and an Asian Film Award for the role.

Selected filmography
 Once Upon a Time in Triad Society (1996)
 Mars (2004)
 The Hospital (2006)
 Girlfriend, Boyfriend (2012)
 Love By Design (2016)
 Packages from Daddy (2016)
 Cities of Last Things (2018)

References

External links
 

1970 births
Living people
Taiwanese film actresses
Taiwanese television actresses
20th-century Taiwanese actresses
21st-century Taiwanese actresses
People from Changhua County